Fake news in the Philippines refers to the general and widespread misinformation or disinformation in the country by various actors. It has been problematic in the Philippines where social media and alike plays a key role in influencing topics and information ranging from politics, health, belief, religion, current events, aid, lifestyle, elections and others. Recently, it has evolved to be a rampant issue against the COVID-19 pandemic in the Philippines and the 2022 Philippine general election.  

Following the 2016 Philippine election, Senator Francis Pangilinan filed a proposal to hold an inquiry regarding the conduct of social media platforms that allowed for the spreading of fake news. Pangilinan called for penalties for social media companies that allow disinformation to spread on their platforms.

History 
According to media analysts, developing countries such as the Philippines, with generally new access to social media and democracy, feel the problem of fake news to a larger extent. Facebook is one of the largest platforms being an open website, that works as a booster to sway the opinion of the public due to manufactured stories. While Facebook provides free media sources, it does not provide its users with the access to fact checking websites. Because of this, government authorities call for a tool that will filter out "fake news" to secure the integrity of cyberspace in the Philippines. Rappler, a social news network in the Philippines, investigated online networks of Rodrigo Duterte supporters and discovered that they include fake news, fake accounts, bots, and trolls, which Rappler thinks are being used to silence dissent. The creation of fake news, and fake news accounts on social media has been a danger to the political health of the country. According to Kate Lamble and Megha Mohan of BBC news, "What we're seeing on social media again is manufactured reality... They also create a very real chilling effect against normal people, against journalists (who) are the first targets, and they attack in very personal ways with death threats and rape threats." Journalists are often risking their lives in publishing articles that contest fake news in the Philippines.

The 2016 Filipino election was influenced, in large part, by false information propagated by fake news outlets. By New York Times contributor Miguel Syjuco's account, President Rodrigo Duterte benefited from a disproportionate amount of complimentary fake news compared to his opponents. The pro-Duterte propaganda spread across Filipino social media include fake endorsements from prominent public figures like Pope Francis and Angela Merkel. Duterte's own campaign was responsible for a portion of the misinformation spread during the election; according to a study from Oxford University's Computational Propaganda Research Program, Duterte's campaign paid an estimated $200,000 for dedicated trolls to undermine dissenters and disseminate misinformation in 2016.

In one incident, Justice Secretary Vitaliano Aguirre II tagged opposition senators and other people as masterminds of the 2017 Marawi Crisis attack, based on a photo shared on social media and blog sites that produce fake news. Another government official, Communications Assistant Secretary Margaux "Mocha" Uson has also been accused of spreading fake news.

The prevalence of fake news in the Philippines has pushed lawmakers to file laws to combat it, like criminalizing its dissemination. The Catholic Bishops Conference of the Philippines strongly opposes the spread of fake news as a sin, and published a list of fake news websites.

Structure and hierarchy 
In 2018, Dr. Jason Cabañes of the University of Leeds School of Media and Communication and Dr. Jonathan Corpus Ong of the University of Massachusetts Amherst released a study of organized disinformation efforts in the Philippines, titled "Architects of Networked Disinformation: Behind the Scenes of Troll Accounts and Fake News Production in the Philippines." Based on participant observation in Facebook community groups and Twitter accounts, as well as key informant interviews with twenty "disinformation architects," conducted from December 2016 to December 2017, the study described a "professionalized and hierarchized group of political operators who design disinformation campaigns, mobilize click armies, and execute innovative “digital black ops” and “signal scrambling” techniques for any interested political client." This network had “ad and PR strategists at the top.”

As a tool of historical denialism 

Ong and Cabañes' 2018 study revealed that techniques of "personal branding" and such tools as YouTube videos were used to "tell a revisionist account of the 20-year Marcos regime as 'the golden age of the Philippines' in a bid to restore the political luster of the Marcos family."

The study also revealed the existence of an "Ilibing Na" ("Bury now") campaign designed to create public support for a hero’s burial for Ferdinand Marcos using "diversionary tactics to elude allegations of human rights violations and corruption during the term of Ferdinand Marcos" and launching "digital black ops that targeted prominent critics” of the Marcoses, particularly vice president Leni Robredo.

List of fake news websites 

This list includes URLs for sites that are now down or defunct for historical purposes and to aid disinformation researchers. The following are included after investigation conducted by various Philippine news agencies as well as government policies against fake news.

Reactions 
Fake news sites have become rampant for Philippine audiences, especially being shared on social media. Politicians have started filing laws to combat fake news and three Senate hearings have been held on the topic.

The Catholic Church in the Philippines has also released a missive speaking out against it.

Vera Files research at the end of 2017 and 2018 show that the most shared fake news in the Philippines appeared to benefit 2 people the most: President Rodrigo Duterte (as well as his allies) and politician and later president Bongbong Marcos, with the most viral news driven by shares on networks of Facebook pages. Most Philippine audience Facebook pages and groups spreading online disinformation also bear "Duterte", "Marcos" or "News" in their names and are pro-Duterte. Online disinformation in the Philippines is overwhelmingly political as well, with most attacking groups or individuals critical of the Duterte administration. Many Philippine-audience fake news websites also appear to be controlled by the same operators as they share common Google AdSense and Google Analytics IDs.

According to media scholar Jonathan Corpus Ong, Duterte's presidential campaign is regarded as the patient zero in the current era of disinformation, having preceded widespread global coverage of the Cambridge Analytica scandal and Russian trolls. Fake news is so established and severe in the Philippines that Facebook's Global Politics and Government Outreach Director Katie Harbath also calls it "patient zero" in the global misinformation epidemic, having happened before Brexit, the Trump nomination and the 2016 US Elections.

See also
 Mocha Uson
 RJ Nieto
 List of fake news websites

References 

Mass media in the Philippines
Fake news in the Philippines